Endozoicomonas atrinae is a Gram-negative, rod-shaped, aerobic and non-motile bacterium from the genus of Endozoicomonas which has been isolated from the intestinal tract of the mollusk Atrina pectinata from Yeosu in Korea.

References

Oceanospirillales
Bacteria described in 2014